Guelph/Eramosa is a township located in Wellington County, in midwestern Ontario, Canada. It partly encircles the city of Guelph, surrounding it in a continuous arc from approximately northeast to south-southwest of the city. It is part of the Guelph census metropolitan area.

History

The township was created in 1999 by the merger of the townships of Guelph and Eramosa, as well as parts of Pilkington and Nichol townships. The name Eramosa was derived from the native word Un-ne-mo-sah (possibly meaning "black dog", "dead dog", or simply "dog").

Eramosa Township was settled primarily by Scots and Irish; in 1841, its population was 935.

The mayor of Guelph/Eramosa in 2018 is Christopher White (who was first elected in 2010). Township councillors are Bruce Dickieson, Corey Woods, Louise Marshall, and Mark Bouwmeester.  County councillors are Don McKay and Doug Breen.

Auto parts manufacturer Linamar was started in the village of Ariss in 1964 by Hungarian refugee Frank Hasenfratz, initially in his basement. The company, with a staff of five, was incorporated in 1966 as Linamar Machine Limited. Linamar's first major contract was to manufacture automotive oil pumps for Ford. Linamar now operates 22 plants in Guelph.

Communities
Prior to European settlement, this area was occupied by the Attawandaron, also known as the Neutrals in the 1600s. They were an Iroquoian-speaking people. The territory was later held by the Mississaugas of the Credit River; they sold a large tract of land to the government in 1818 and it was first surveyed that year. The name Eramosa was applied to the large parcel of land.

Rockwood is the main community in the township. Today Highway 7 gives access to Rockwood, located between Acton and the city of Guelph. The Eramosa River runs through the centre of the village. Anglo-Europeans settled here because of the river; it provided power for mills, some of the first businesses established. They were integral to industry and became the economic engine of the settlement.

In addition, limestone was extracted for industrial use in those years. The former quarry and mining areas are now protected as the nearby Rockwood Conservation Area. The conservation area is used for such recreation as swimming, hiking, canoeing, picnicking and camping from the last Friday in April to the Sunday following Thanksgiving. It attracts more than 65,000 visitors annually. The conservation area features a small reservoir on the Eramosa River, karst formations, and caves.

The township also includes the smaller communities of Ariss, Brucedale, Centre Inn, Eden Mills, Eramosa, Everton, and Marden. Several former place names connected to 19th-century mills and post offices, such as Armstrong Mills, Birge Mills, Mosborough, and Rockcut, continue to appear on some maps of the area.

Settler Adam Argo named a small area as Eden Mills in 1846 after building a mill there. Over the years, the hamlet had a grist mill, an oatmeal mill, and several saw mills, all powered by the Eramosa River. Other businesses also thrived.

In the 20th century, it had a stop for the Toronto Suburban railway (the station area was later developed as the Edgewood Camp), which ran from Toronto to Guelph. As recently as 1950, two churches and a school (SS#11) operated in the hamlet. The population of the hamlet in early 2019 was 350.

James J. Hill, founder of the Great Northern Railway, was born in Rockwood in 1838.

Demographics

Government 
Guelph/Eramosa is governed by a mayor and four councillors, with one councillor representing each of the four municipal wards. The Mayor of Guelph/Eramosa represents the town on the Wellington County Council. As of the 2022 election, the elected council members are:

Mayor: Chris White

Councillors:

 Ward 1: Bruce Dickieson
 Ward 2: Corey Woods
 Ward 3: Steven Liebig
 Ward 4: Mark Bouwmeester

Transportation

 and  pass through the township, with Highway 7 passing through Rockwood.

The Metrolinx Guelph Subdivision railway line runs through the southern part of the township. It is used for both passengers and freight (the latter operated by the Canadian National Railway). Rockwood formerly had a railway station, which was relocated south to the Halton County Radial Railway Museum (technically in the neighbouring town of Milton) for preservation after the end of service.

Education
Guelph/Eramosa township contains three public elementary schools administered by the Upper Grand District School Board. These are:
 Eramosa Public School
 Rockwood Centennial Public School
 Harris Mill Public School (French Immersion)

The Wellington Catholic District School Board opened its first school in the Township in September 2016:
 Sacred Heart Catholic School

There is also one private school located in Guelph/Eramosa:
 Elora Road Christian School

Media
Guelph/Eramosa is covered by local newspapers and television through the following services:
 The Wellington Advertiser
 TVCogeco
 The Acton New Tanner

See also
List of townships in Ontario

References

External links

Township municipalities in Ontario
Lower-tier municipalities in Ontario
Municipalities in Wellington County, Ontario